Highgate, Saskatchewan is an unincorporated area in the rural municipality of Battle River No. 438, Saskatchewan, in the Canadian province of Saskatchewan.  Highgate is located on Saskatchewan Highway 16, the Yellowhead in north western Saskatchewan.  Highgate siding, a railroad siding and post office first opened in 1919 at the legal land description of Sec.17, Twp.45, R.17, W3.  The population is smaller than a hamlet, and is counted within the  RM.  Highgate is located just north west of North Battleford, Saskatchewan.

See also 
List of communities in Saskatchewan
List of rural municipalities in Saskatchewan

References 

Battle River No. 438, Saskatchewan
Unincorporated communities in Saskatchewan
Division No. 12, Saskatchewan